Nikola Milutinov (born 30 December 1994) is a Serbian professional basketball player for CSKA Moscow of the VTB United League. He also represents the Serbia national basketball team internationally.

Professional career

Hemofarm
Milutinov made his professional debut with the Serbian club Hemofarm, in the 2011–12 season.

Partizan Belgrade (2012–2015)
In June 2012, Milutinov signed a four-year contract with Partizan Belgrade of the Adriatic League. In his first season with Partizan, he won the Adriatic League 2012–13 season championship, and the Serbian League 2012–13 season championship. In his second season, he won the Serbian League championship for the second time in a row, after his team defeated Crvena zvezda, with a 3–1 win in the league's finals series.

In the 2014–15 season, following the departure of Partizan starters Dejan Musli and Joffrey Lauvergne, Milutinov's role in the team increased. In a 15 November game against Levski Sofia, he posted a season-high 21 points, and also added 10 rebounds. For that performance, he was selected to the Adriatic League 2014–15 season's ideal five of Round 8 of the competition. On 14 April, in Game 1 of the Adriatic League semifinal series against Crvena zvezda, he hurt the cornea in his right eye, after a collision with Jaka Blažič. He returned to action in the following game, although without the recommendation of the team's medical staff. Eventually, Crvena zvezda won the Adriatic League's finals series over Milutinov's team, Partizan, with a 3–1 series score. Over 28 games played in the Adriatic League that season, Milutinov averaged 9.8 points and 7.6 rebounds per game.

Olympiacos (2015–2020)
On 25 July 2015, Milutinov signed a three-year deal with the Greek League club Olympiacos. With Olympiacos, he won the Greek League 2015–16 season championship. He was named the Greek League Most Improved Player in 2017. Milutinov also reached the Euroleague final with Olympiakos in the same year.

In October 2017, he extended his contract with Olympiacos for three more seasons. In the 2017–18 season, Olympiacos was eliminated in the playoff series to Žalgiris Kaunas with 3–1. Milutinov had his best season since coming into the club, and averaged career-highs of 8.8 points and 5.7 rebounds over 29 EuroLeague games.

In 2018–19 season, Milutinov appeared in 28 games of the EuroLeague and averaged new career-highs of 11.7 points and league's second-highest 7.9 rebounds, while shooting 66.3% from the field. In the Greek League, he averaged 10.9 points and 7 rebounds over 24 games.

CSKA Moscow (2020–present)
On 2 June 2020, Milutinov signed a three-year contract with Russian club CSKA Moscow. On December 30, 2020, Milutinov set the EuroLeague record for most offensive rebounds in a game – he had 16 offensive rebounds in a 91–87 win over Olimpia Milano, finishing the game with 17 points and career-high 19 total rebounds.

NBA draft rights
On 16 April 2015, Milutinov declared himself eligible for the 2015 NBA draft. On 25 June 2015, Milutinov was selected with the 26th overall pick of the first round of the draft, by the San Antonio Spurs. On 6 August 2021, the Spurs sent his draft rights to the Brooklyn Nets as part of a multi-team trade.

National team career

Junior team
Milutinov played for the Serbian under-19 national team, at the 2013 FIBA Under-19 World Cup, in Prague, on a roster alongside Vasilije Micić, Mihajlo Andrić, Jovan Novak, Nikola Jokić, and Nikola Janković. He won the silver medal at the tournament, after losing 68–82 to the U.S. under-19 team, which featured Aaron Gordon, Justise Winslow, Elfrid Payton, Marcus Smart, and Jahlil Okafor. Milutinov averaged 10.7 points and 5.9 rebounds per game at the tournament.

Senior team
Milutinov represented the senior men's Serbian national basketball team for the first time, at the EuroBasket 2015, under the team's head coach Aleksandar Đorđević. In the first phase of the tournament, Serbia dominated in the toughest group of the tournament, Group B, with a 5–0 record, and they then eliminated Finland and the Czech Republic, in the round of 16 and quarterfinal games, respectively. However, they were beaten in the semifinal game by Lithuania, by a score of 67–64, and they would go on to eventually lose to the tournament's host team, France, in the bronze-medal game, by a score of 81–68. Milutinov appeared in 6 games during the tournament, playing in only 3.5 minutes per game, the lowest on the team.

At the 2019 FIBA Basketball World Cup, the national team of Serbia was dubbed as favorite to win the trophy, but was eventually upset in the quarterfinals by Argentina. With wins over the United States and Czech Republic, it finished in fifth place. Milutinov averaged 7 points and 2.3 rebounds over 8 games.

Career statistics

EuroLeague

|-
| style="text-align:left;"| 2012–13
| style="text-align:left;" rowspan="2"|Partizan
| 8 || 1 || 7.9 || .556 ||  || .750 || 1.4 || .1 || .1 || .3 || 3.3 || 2.9
|-
| style="text-align:left;"| 2013–14
| 21 || 16 || 20.3 || .513 ||  || .640 || 3.3 || 1.0 || .2 || .6 || 4.7 || 4.4
|-
| style="text-align:left;"| 2015–16
| style="text-align:left;" rowspan=5| Olympiacos
| 18 || 13 || 10.8 || .542 ||  || .778 || 2.7 || .3 || .3 || .7 || 3.7 || 4.1
|-
| style="text-align:left;"| 2016–17
| 36 || 15 || 12.7 || .579 || .000 || .692 || 3.3 || .6 || .3 || .8 || 4.4 || 5.8
|-
| style="text-align:left;"| 2017–18
| 29 || 26 || 21.7 || .653 ||  || .756 || 5.7 || 1.0 || .6 || .6 || 8.8 || 14.0
|-
| style="text-align:left;"| 2018–19
| 28 || 28 || 26.0 || .663 || 1.000 || .740 || 7.9 || 1.5 || .6 || .7 || 11.7 || 20.0
|-
| style="text-align:left;"| 2019–20
| 24 || 24 || 24.6 || .656 ||  || .765 || style="background:#cfecec;"| 8.2* || 1.2 || .5 || .6 || 10.3 || 19.2
|-
| style="text-align:left;"| 2020–21
| style="text-align:left;" rowspan=2| CSKA Moscow
| 20 || 19 || 23.3 || .670 || .500 || .702 || style="background:#cfecec;"|8.6* || .8 || .4 || .5 || 9.8 || 17.9
|-
| style="text-align:left;"| 2021–22
| 16 || 13 || 19.0 || .585 || .000 || .711 || 6.5 || .9 || .4 || .4 || 7.7 || 13.6
|- class="sortbottom"
| style="text-align:center;" colspan=2| Career
| 200 || 155 || 19.2 || .622 || .400 || .732 || 5.5 || .9 || .4 || .6 || 7.5 || 12.0

Personal life
On October 3, 2020, Milutinov was reported to have tested positive for the COVID-19.

See also 
 List of NBA drafted players from Serbia
 San Antonio Spurs draft history

References

External links
 Nikola Milutinov at esake.gr 
 Nikola Milutinov at baskethotel.com 
 Nikola Milutinov at draftexpress.com
 Nikola Milutinov at euroleague.net
 Nikola Milutinov at fiba.com (archive)
 
 

1994 births
Living people
ABA League players
Basketball League of Serbia players
Centers (basketball)
KK Hemofarm players
KK Partizan players
Olympiacos B.C. players
PBC CSKA Moscow players
San Antonio Spurs draft picks
Serbia men's national basketball team players
Serbian expatriate basketball people in Greece
Serbian expatriate basketball people in Russia
Serbian men's basketball players
Basketball players from Novi Sad
2019 FIBA Basketball World Cup players